U.S. Route 52 (US 52) in the state of Illinois, is a surface road that traverses the north central and eastern portions of the state. It runs from the Dale Gardner Veterans Memorial Bridge over the Mississippi River between Sabula, Iowa, and Savanna with Illinois Route 64 (IL 64) southeast to the Indiana state line near Sheldon with US 24.

Route description

US 52 travels southeast from the Dale Gardner Veterans Memorial Bridge at the terminus of Iowa Highway 64 (Iowa 64) and IL 64 in Savanna, going through the cities of Dixon, Amboy and Mendota.

US 52 then turns due south and then east, crossing Interstate 39 (I-39) and US 51 near Troy Grove. It continues east, traveling through Shorewood and then through the southern portion of Joliet, where it is a major thoroughfare in the city of Joliet (Jefferson Street), avoiding the city of Chicago proper. It joins with US 45 through Kankakee, and then travels concurrently with US 24, east of Watseka to the Indiana state line.

History
In 1936, much of IL 27, IL 44, and IL 69 were replaced by current US 52 as well as portions of IL 2 south of Dixon, IL 49 south of Kankakee, and IL 116 east of L'Erable. Between 1936 and 1940, US 52 originally bypassed Joliet via parts of present-day IL 47 and IL 113. In 1940, US 52 was rerouted through Joliet to Kankakee. Subsequently, IL 44 and IL 69 were entirely decommissioned.

Major intersections

References

External links

 Illinois
52
Transportation in Carroll County, Illinois
Transportation in Ogle County, Illinois
Transportation in Lee County, Illinois
Transportation in LaSalle County, Illinois
Transportation in Kendall County, Illinois
Transportation in Will County, Illinois
Transportation in Kankakee County, Illinois
Transportation in Iroquois County, Illinois